Onur Ünlüçifçi (born 24 April 1997) is a German-Turkish professional footballer who plays as a midfielder for FSV Frankfurt.

References

External links
 

1997 births
Living people
Footballers from Frankfurt
German footballers
German people of Turkish descent
Association football midfielders
Würzburger Kickers players
SG Sonnenhof Großaspach players
SV Waldhof Mannheim players
FSV Frankfurt players
3. Liga players
Regionalliga players